The Coat of arms of the Macedonian Orthodox Church – Archdiocese of Ohrid are the official arms of the Macedonian Orthodox Church – Archdiocese of Ohrid adopted on November 12, 2009, replacing the old coat of arms of the church. The new coat of arms was adopted on the meeting in Skopje where the historical name "Archdiocese of Ohrid" was added to the organisation's name.

References

Ecclesiastical heraldry
Macedonian Orthodox Church